Deuzeld is a neighborhood in the Belgian municipality of Schoten. The neighborhood is located southwest of central Schoten, and lies near the border with the Antwerp district of Merksem. To the south of the Deuzeld neighborhood lies the Albert Canal, which connects Antwerp with Liège. The neighborhood is geographically separated from the rest of Schoten by several nature domains located along the path of the aborted A102 highway project.

History 
For a long time, the Deuzeld formed a small hamlet containing only a few homes, situated between Merksem and Schoten, as can be seen on, for example, the Ferraris map, made by the Austrian general Joseph de Ferraris on the orders of emperor Joseph II. With the advent of the industrial revolution however in the 19th century, and the construction of the Kempische Canal (1847) and its replacement Albert Canal (1946), the neighborhood quickly grew in numbers. In the late 19th century, a first church was built at the Kruiningenstraat. In 1961, work commenced on the new Heilig Hart church, which was opened the following year.
Originally, a castle called the Cogelshof could be found at the Deuzeldlaan, which was eventually demolished because of its bad material condition. The castle was replaced in the 1970s by the Cogelspark and the Cogelshof service centre, built in glass and concrete, which was renovated in 2011 and is used by the OCMW.
In 2008, the Deuzeldlaan, the main street of the neighborhood, was completely reconstructed, adding green elements and creating more room for cyclists. Plans exist to built a new bridge over the Albert Canal in the neighborhood, called the Kruiningenbrug, which would only be used by pedestrians and cyclists.

References

External links 
 http://www.heilighartschoten.be, website of the local parochy using the Heilig Hart kerk (in Dutch).

Populated places in Antwerp Province
Neighbourhoods in Belgium
Schoten